Hazzard may refer to:

 The Hazzards, a US band
 Hazzard, a German band

People
 Brad Hazzard (born 1951), Australian politician
 Brittany Hazzard (born 1990), American songwriter, singer and rapper known professionally as Starrah
 Chris Hazzard (born 1985), Northern Irish Sinn Féin politician
 David Hazzard (1781–1864), American merchant and politician
 Johnny Hazzard (born 1977), American pornographic actor and recording artist
 Linda Hazzard (1867–1938), American doctor
 Margaret Hazzard (died 1987), Australian author native to Norfolk Island
Noel Hazzard, Australian rugby league footballer
 Shirley Hazzard (1931–2016), Australian born author of fiction and non-fiction
 Tony Hazzard (born 1943), English singer and songwriter
 Walt Hazzard (1942–2011), American basketball player

Media
 Mark Hazzard: Merc, a comic book series published by Marvel Comics under their New Universe imprint

See also 

Hazard (disambiguation)
 The Dukes of Hazzard, an American television series